Čenkovice is a municipality and village in Ústí nad Orlicí District in the Pardubice Region of the Czech Republic. It has about 200 inhabitants. It is a centre of winter sports.

Geography
It lies in the Orlické Mountains. The Bystřec stream springs in the village and flows through the municipality.

History
The first written mention of Čenkovice is from 1304.

Sport
Čenkovice is known for a ski resort located on Buková hora and its surroundings. There are 65 km of cross-country trails and five ski slopes.

References

External links

Orlicko municipal association

Villages in Ústí nad Orlicí District